Sabz-Ali Khodadad (born in 1959, Hatkeh Posht village, Babol) was the commander of the 2nd Brigade of "Karbala-25 Division" and the Malik-Ashtar Brigade (in Kurdistan) during Iran-Iraq War. He died on 30 November 1986 owing to hitting by mortar fragments—in "Operation Karbala-4" during the reconnaissance operations in the region. Khodadad was buried in the city of Babol.

Khodadad became an official member of the Islamic Revolutionary Guard Corps in 1980 and joined the Tehran Revolutionary Guard Corps in early 1981. Sabzali Khodadad participated in the Iran-Iraq war, in the Operations Quds 1 and Valfajr 8 (liberation of the city of Faw) in February 1986. In 1987, he participated in Operation Karbala 1 (i.e. the liberation of Mehran city). Operation Karbala-4 was considered as the last reconnaissance-operation that Sabz-Ali Khodadad participated in, which finally resulted in his death by shrapnel from a 60-mm mortar shell.

See also 
 List of Iranian commanders in the Iran–Iraq War

References

1959 births
1986 deaths
Iranian military personnel killed in the Iran–Iraq War
Islamic Revolutionary Guard Corps personnel of the Iran–Iraq War